Héctor Hugo Hurtado Salazar (born 21 September 1975) is a former Colombian football striker who last played for América de Cali.

When he retired from his career as a professional player in 2014 he became a sports technician.

Career 
On April 13, 2008, he scored his first career hat-trick against Sport Boys. Universitario won the fixture 5-1.

Statistics 
Universitario Statistics: 2007 Apertura

Universitario Statistics: 2007 Clausura

Universitario Statistics: 2008 Apertura

Universitario Statistics: 2008 Clausura

International 
Hurtado played for the Colombia national team between 1999 and 2005.

External links

1975 births
Living people
Colombian footballers
Colombia international footballers
América de Cali footballers
Sport Club Internacional players
Cortuluá footballers
Atlético Nacional footballers
Independiente Santa Fe footballers
Club Universitario de Deportes footballers
Sporting Cristal footballers
Club Deportivo Universidad César Vallejo footballers
Categoría Primera A players
Peruvian Primera División players
Colombian expatriate footballers
Expatriate footballers in Brazil
Expatriate footballers in Peru
2000 CONCACAF Gold Cup players
2005 CONCACAF Gold Cup players
Association football forwards
Sportspeople from Valle del Cauca Department